Rough Draft: Pop Culture the Way It Almost Was is a 2001 humor book by Modern Humorist, consisting of illustrations of fictional early versions of real products.

External links
 
 Official site
 Review

Comedy books